Narsinghpur district (also referred to Narsimhapur district) is a district of Madhya Pradesh state in central India. The city of Narsinghpur is administrative headquarters of the district. As of 2001 Narsinghpur is the most literate district of MP. Village Singhpur bada in Narsinghpur is also considered as bahubali's and goon's village

Geography
The district has an area 5,125.55 km2. The district is part of the Jabalpur Division. It is bounded on the north by Sagar and Damoh districts, on the east by Jabalpur District, on the southeast by Seoni District, on the south by Chhindwara District, on the west by Hoshangabad District, and on the northwest by Raisen District. The administrative seat is Narsinghpur.

The district sits in the basin of the Narmada River. The Vindhya Range skirts the northern end of the district. The Satpura Range forms the district's southern boundary. It is located between 220 55’ and 230 15’ north latitude, and 780  38’ and 790  38’ east longitudes. It has an average elevation of 359.8 m above mean sea level.

History
At the beginning of the 19th century, Narsinghpur District was in the domain of the Maratha Bhonsle Maharajas of Nagpur, and was known as "Gadaria Kheda". Later this district was ceded to the British Raj in 1818. Narsinghpur District was part of the Nerbudda (Narmada) Division of the Central Provinces and Berar, which became the state of Madhya Bharat (later Madhya Pradesh) after India's independence in 1947.

Demographics

According to the 2011 census Narsinghpur District has a population of 1,091,854, roughly equal to the nation of Cyprus or the US state of Rhode Island. This gives it a ranking of 418th in India (out of a total of 640). Its population growth rate over the decade 2001-2011 was 14.04%. Narsimhapur has a sex ratio of 917 females for every 1000 males, and a literacy rate of 76.79%. 18.64% of the population lives in urban areas. Scheduled Castes and Tribes make up 16.87% and 13.36% of the population respectively.

Hindi is the predominant language, spoken by 99.06% of the population.

Education
Government Multipurpose Higher Secondary School
Government Post Graduate College
Government School of Excellence
Chavara Vidya Peeth Schl
Narsingh Public School
Kendriya Vidhyalaya
Saraswati School

Laurels English Medium High school
siyal international school

Transport
The main rail line from Mumbai to Kolkata, which follows the Narmada River valley, runs through the district from west to east.

There is a bus stand located near the station. Previously it was at the city center. The town is around the National Highway - 26.

Notable personalities
 Maharshi Mahesh Yogi
 Ashutosh Rana
 Bhawani Prasad Mishra
 S H Raza
 Mohit Daga
 Late Shyam Sundar Rawat
 Chandra Mohan (Hindi actor)

References

External links
 Official website

 
Districts of Madhya Pradesh